Aull is a municipality in the district of Rhein-Lahn, in Rhineland-Palatinate, in western Germany. It belongs to the association community of Diez.

Geography
Aull is located in the east of Rhineland-Palatinate between the Taunus and Westerwald on the Lahn, at the western end of the Limburg Basin. It is bordered on the south by the city of Diez, in the north by the community of Gückingen (both in Rheinland-Pfalz) and in the east by the Limburg district (in Hessen).

References

Rhein-Lahn-Kreis